Kim Wilde (born Kim Smith, 18 November 1960) is an English pop singer, DJ and television presenter. She first saw success in 1981 with her debut single "Kids in America", which peaked at No. 2 in the UK. In 1983, she received the Brit Award for Best British Female solo artist. In 1986, she had a UK No. 2 hit with a reworked version of the Supremes' song "You Keep Me Hangin' On", which also topped the US Billboard Hot 100 in 1987. Between 1981 and 1996, she had 25 singles that charted within the Top 50 of the UK Singles Chart. Her other hits include "Chequered Love" (1981), "You Came" (1988), and "Never Trust a Stranger" (1988). In 2003, she collaborated with Nena on the song "Anyplace, Anywhere, Anytime", which topped the Dutch charts.

She holds the record for being the most-charted British female solo act of the 1980s, with seventeen UK Top 40 hit singles. Starting in 1998, while still active in music, she has branched into an alternative career as a landscape gardener, which has included presenting gardening shows on the BBC and Channel 4. In 2005, she won a Gold award for her courtyard garden at the Royal Horticultural Society’s Chelsea Flower Show.

Early life

The eldest child of 1950s rock and roller Marty Wilde (birth name Reginald Smith) and Joyce Baker, who had been a member of the singing and dancing group the Vernons Girls, Kim Smith was born in the West London suburb of Chiswick and attended Oakfield Preparatory School, in the Southeast London area of Dulwich. When she was nine, the family moved to Hertfordshire, where she was educated at Tewin and later Presdales School. In 1980, at age 20, she completed a foundation course at St Albans College of Art & Design. As Kim Wilde, she was signed to RAK Records by Mickie Most.

Music career

The RAK years
Wilde's father Marty and brother, Ricky, were responsible for writing virtually all of her material in the early-to-mid 1980s. Key influences on the songwriting process included Orchestral Manoeuvres in the Dark (OMD), Ultravox, John Foxx, Gary Numan, Skids, Sex Pistols, the Clash, Kraftwerk and the Stranglers. Wilde released her debut single "Kids in America" in January 1981. An instant success, it reached No. 2 in the UK Singles Chart and scaled the Top 5 in other countries such as Germany, France and Australia. Although it achieved only moderate success in the US, peaking at No. 25 when released in 1982, it is often regarded today as Wilde's signature song. Her debut studio album Kim Wilde (1981) repeated the success of the single, spawning two further hits in "Chequered Love" (Top 5 in the UK, France, Australia and Germany) and the UK-only single "Water on Glass" (UK No. 11).

Wilde's follow-up album was 1982's Select, led by the hit singles "Cambodia" and "View from a Bridge". Both were No. 1 hits in France and reached Top 10 positions in Germany and Australia. At the time, there was some controversy about Wilde's hesitation to do live concerts. Her first concerts in September 1982 took place in Denmark, before embarking on a UK-wide tour in October. Wilde's third studio album, Catch as Catch Can (1983) was a relative commercial failure. The first single from the album, "Love Blonde", was another success in France and Scandinavia, but failed to have major success in other countries. The failure of the album led to her leaving RAK and signing with MCA Records in the summer of 1984.

The MCA years
Wilde's first album for MCA Teases & Dares (1984) was again overlooked in her home country, but fared better in Germany, France and Scandinavia as well as scoring another German Top 10 single with "The Second Time" (which was Top 30 in the UK). The video for this song appeared in an episode of the 1980s TV hit Knight Rider in 1985. The second single, "The Touch", was not a commercial success, but the third single, the rockabilly "Rage to Love", made the UK top 20 in 1985. On Teases & Dares, Wilde made her first songwriting contributions, penning two songs. Meanwhile, she had embarked on three European concert tours (1983, 1985 and 1986).

On her fifth studio album, 1986's Another Step, Wilde wrote or co-wrote most of the songs. The album's lead single "Schoolgirl" flopped in Europe and Australia, but Wilde's fortunes improved in spectacular fashion with the album's second single, a Hi-NRG remake of the Supremes classic "You Keep Me Hangin' On". After topping the charts in Australia and Canada and peaking at No. 2 in the UK, it became a US No. 1 single in 1987. With that hit, she became the fifth UK female solo artist ever to top the US Hot 100, following Petula Clark, Lulu, Sheena Easton, and Bonnie Tyler. Her popularity, especially in her native UK, was revitalised and she scored further Top 10 hits in 1987 with "Another Step (Closer to You)" (recorded with Junior) and "Rockin' Around the Christmas Tree" (a Comic Relief charity single, recorded with comedian Mel Smith).

In 1988, Wilde released her biggest selling album to date, Close, which returned her to the UK top 10 and spent almost eight months on the UK album chart. It produced four major European hits: "Hey Mister Heartache", "You Came", "Never Trust a Stranger" and "Four Letter Word" (the last 3 were Top 10 hits in the UK). The release of the album coincided with a tour of Europe, where she was the opening act for Michael Jackson's Bad World Tour. Wilde released her next studio album, Love Moves, in 1990. The album barely made the UK Top 40, and, although it was a Top 10 success in Scandinavian countries, it failed to sell as well as its predecessor and only spawned two minor hits, "It's Here" a Top 20 success in Middle and Northern Europe as well as "Can't Get Enough (Of Your Love)", her last Top 20 hit in France. She toured Europe again, this time opening for fellow Briton David Bowie.

A collaboration with Rick Nowels, who had produced hits for Stevie Nicks and Belinda Carlisle, resulted in the guitar-driven pop of the single "Love Is Holy" and the album Love Is (1992). The album's success was again limited to a small number of countries, though the single became another Top 20 hit in the UK, and the second single ("Heart over Mind") also made the Top 40. In 1993, she released her first official compilation album The Singles Collection 1981–1993, which was a success throughout Europe and Australia and the dancefloor-influenced single "If I Can't Have You" (a cover of the Yvonne Elliman song from the film Saturday Night Fever that was penned by the Bee Gees), became her last UK Top 20 Hit as well as a No. 3 hit in Australia.

Wilde embarked on a huge "Greatest Hits" concert tour through Europe in 1994 and also toured Australia and Japan for the first time in six years. Her next studio album, Now & Forever (1995), was a commercial failure worldwide. Her single "Breakin' Away", however, was a minor hit, and the follow-up, "This I Swear", was also a minor hit in Europe. She released the single "Shame" in 1996, an Evelyn "Champagne" King cover. From February 1996 to February 1997, Wilde appeared in London's West End production of the rock musical, Tommy. After this, Wilde started recording a new studio album. However, there were problems with her record company – MCA Records had by that time become part of Universal Music Group – and legal problems concerning the songs. Subsequently, Wilde abandoned the album which remains unreleased.

Return to pop

Since November 2001, Wilde has toured the UK three times (and once in Australia during 2003) as part of the Here and Now Tour, an Eighties revival concert series, together with artists such as Paul Young, the Human League, Belinda Carlisle, Howard Jones and Five Star. New recordings also followed; in 2001, she recorded a new track, "Loved", for a compilation album which became a surprise hit in Belgium. She recorded the single "Born to be Wild" in 2002, and in summer of 2003 she had a major hit with "Anyplace, Anywhere, Anytime", a duet with German pop star Nena. The single was a Top 10 hit in Germany, Belgium, Austria, Netherlands and Switzerland.

In 2006, Wilde signed a new recording contract with EMI Germany and released the first single from her tenth studio album in many countries across Europe, Scandinavia and Asia. "You Came 2006" charted Top 20 in most of these countries and became her biggest solo hit in Germany since 1988. The album Never Say Never included eight new tracks plus five re-worked previous hits and has charted in Belgium, France, Switzerland, Austria and Germany. The second single from the album, which was voted for by fans on her official website was "Perfect Girl", released in November 2006 and spent nine weeks on the German Top 100 singles chart. A third single, "Together We Belong", was released in March 2007 and a fourth single, "Baby Obey Me", was released in Germany as a remix featuring German rapper Ill Inspecta.

Since 2003, Wilde has appeared on numerous festival bills and concerts all over Europe with her own band. In early September 2009, a brand new single, "Run to You", recorded as a duet with Swedish rock band Fibes, Oh Fibes!, was released in Sweden. The song reached the Swedish Top 30.

In 2010, Wilde signed a new recording contract with Sony Music Germany. The label released her eleventh studio album, Come Out and Play on 17 August, with "Lights Down Low" preceding that as lead single. The album peaked at No. 10 in Germany and was followed by a tour in Europe in February and March 2011.

Wilde's twelfth studio album, Snapshots, was released on 26 August 2011 and features cover versions of songs hand-picked from the last five decades. A double release of "It's Alright" and "Sleeping Satellite" was released on 19 August as the lead single. Two further singles failed to reach the chart. Wilde toured in support of the album in Germany in March 2012. In November 2012, Wilde was featured as the lead vocalist on Reflekt's "A Beautiful House", which can be found on Armada Music's "Antillas & Dankmann's Best Remix 2002–2012" compilation.

Wilde released her next studio album, Wilde Winter Songbook in November 2013. On 18 December 2017, Wilde released a Christmas single with Lawnmower Deth titled "F U Kristmas!". Wilde released her fourteenth studio album Here Come the Aliens on 16 March 2018. It was inspired by an encounter with a UFO she had in 2009. While sitting in her garden with her husband and a friend, they noticed something odd about the sky and experienced an eerie silence. They observed a huge bright light behind a cloud. Being curious she walked down the grass to track the source of the light and what she noticed was that the light was swiftly moving back and forth. She thought about it every day and it gave her the idea for her new album.

In May 2021, Wilde confirmed she would celebrate 40 years of music with the release of a box set greatest hits album titled, Pop Don't Stop: Greatest Hits. The album was released in August 2021.

Impact and recognition

Wilde holds the record for being the most-charted British female solo act of the 1980s, with seventeen UK Top 40 hit singles throughout the decade (including her duets with Junior Giscombe and Mel Smith).

A number of artists have performed covers of Kim Wilde songs, ranging from pop and rock to dance and death metal versions. On 16 February 1991, then Nirvana drummer Dave Grohl recorded a version of "Kids in America" in an Arlington County, Virginia basement studio. It is the third track on the rare 2015 "Songs from the Laundry Room" Foo Fighters EP, a clip of which plays during the credit roll of the Seattle, Washington episode of Grohl's Sonic Highways documentary TV series. American pop star Tiffany recorded a version of "Kids in America" in 2007 for her album I Think We're Alone Now: '80s Hits and More. German eurodance act Cascada, recorded a version of "Kids in America", on their Everytime We Touch album in 2007.

Wilde has provided inspiration for other artists, including Charlotte Hatherley, who wrote a song about her entitled "Kim Wilde", and included it on her debut album, Grey Will Fade. East German punk rock band Feeling B also recorded a song called "Kim Wilde", which featured on their debut album, Hea Hoa Hoa Hea Hea Hoa (1989). In 1985, French singer Laurent Voulzy paid tribute to Wilde in his song "Les Nuits Sans Kim Wilde" ("The Nights without Kim Wilde"). In her graphic novel Persepolis, Iranian cartoonist Marjane Satrapi has a comic strip titled Kim Wilde. In it the main character Marji, a young Iranian girl, sings "Kids in America" in the streets of the Iranian capital. Also, when her parents go on holiday in Turkey, they buy a poster of Wilde and smuggle it into Tehran for Marji. Marji pins the poster on her bedroom's wall and practises emulating Wilde.

Gardening career
During her first pregnancy, an old interest in gardening resurfaced and she attended Capel Manor College to learn about horticulture, so as to create a garden for her children. As a celebrity, she was asked by Channel 4 to act as a designer for their programme Better Gardens. A year later, she started a two-year commitment with the BBC, recording two series of Garden Invaders.

In 2001, she (along with fellow horticulturist David Fountain) created the "All About Alice" garden for the Tatton Flower Show and was awarded the 'Best Show Garden' award. In 2005, she won a Gold award for her courtyard garden at the Royal Horticultural Society's Chelsea Flower Show. She has designed and created numerous gardens during her involvement in the Better Gardens and Garden Invaders TV programmes and commissioned by individuals and organisations. She has also created gardens for flower shows across the UK. In 2001 she was involved in setting a world record for the largest tree transplantation, when a  London plane was moved from Belgium to a development site in Warrington. After standing in its new location for six years, however, the tree was toppled by a storm in January 2007.

Publications
Wilde has written two books as part of her gardening career. The first, Gardening with Children, was released on 4 April 2005 by Collins publishers. Translations of the book were released at the same time in Spain, France, Denmark and the Netherlands, and later in Germany. Her second book, The First-Time Gardener, was released on 3 April 2006 (again by Collins), and is a beginner's guide to gardening.

Television
Wilde broadened her eco-friendly image by taking on advertising jobs for various 'green' companies. For two years, she featured on advertisements for the highstreet health food shop Holland & Barrett. She wrote infomercials for Bold and Timotei, and in 2008, she started advertising 'green kitchens' for Magnet. In 2019, in a nod to her singing and gardening careers, Cadbury featured Wilde in one of their 30 second TV commercials for their Darkmilk chocolate bar campaign, set in a horticultural setting.

Radio
Wilde presented Secret Songs on Magic 105.4 every Sunday between 10am and 1pm. It later became The Request Show. In 2021, Kim Wilde joined Ireland's Classic Hits Radio, presenting The Kim Wilde 80’s Show which airs in the evenings, four days a week.

Personal life
On 1 September 1996, Wilde married her co-star in Tommy, Hal Fowler, and expressed a desire to have children as soon as possible. On 3 January 1998 she gave birth to Harry Tristan. On 13 January 2000, Rose Elisabeth was born. They announced their separation and subsequent divorce via a statement on Twitter on 21 December 2022.

Discography

Studio albums
Kim Wilde (1981)
Select (1982)
Catch as Catch Can (1983)
Teases & Dares (1984)
Another Step (1986)
Close (1988)
Love Moves (1990)
Love Is (1992)
Now & Forever (1995)
Never Say Never (2006)
Come Out and Play (2010)
Snapshots (2011)
Wilde Winter Songbook (2013)
Here Come the Aliens (2018)

Compilations and other albums
The Very Best of Kim Wilde (1984)
The Singles Collection 1981–1993 (1993)
The Remix Collection (1993)
The Very Best of Kim Wilde (2001)
The Hits Collection (2006)
Pop Don't Stop: Greatest Hits (2021)

Awards
1996 RSH-GOLD Female Classic of 1995 (Germany)
1993 Bambi Award for "The Singles Collection" (Germany)
1990 Diamond Award (Netherlands)
1988 European Platinum Award as female singer who sold the most records across Europe (she shared this award with equally successful 80s singer Sandra)
1984 Golden Otto Best Singer (Germany)
1983 Silver Otto Second Best Singer (Germany)
1982 Silver Otto Second Best Singer (Germany)
1981 Golden Otto Best Singer (Germany)
1981 Rockbjörnen – Best female singer (Sweden)

Billboard Music Awards

!Ref.
|-
| 1985
| rowspan=4|Herself
| Top Pop Singles Artist – Female
| 
| 
|-
| rowspan=6|1987
| Top Pop Singles Artist
| 
| rowspan=6|
|-
| Top Pop Album Artist – Female
| 
|-
| Top Dance Sales Artist
| 
|-
| rowspan=3|"You Keep Me Hangin' On"
| Top Pop Single
| 
|-
| Top Hot Crossover Single
| 
|-
| Top Dance Sales 12' Single
| 

Brit Awards

!Ref.
|-
| 1983
| rowspan=4|Herself
| rowspan=4|British Female Solo Artist
| 
|
|-
| 1985
| 
|
|-
| 1987
| 
|
|-
| 1988
| 
|

Classic Pop Reader Awards

|-
| rowspan=3|2019
| rowspan=2|Herself
| Artist of the Year
| 
|-
| Live Act of the Year
| 
|-
| "Kandy Krush"
| Single of the Year
| 

Smash Hits Poll Winners Party

|-
| rowspan=2|1981
| rowspan=18|Herself
| Best Female Singer
| 
|-
| rowspan=2|Most Fanciable Female
| 
|-
| rowspan=2|1982
| 
|-
| rowspan=2|Best Female Singer
| 
|-
| rowspan=2|1983
| 
|-
| rowspan=2|Most Fanciable Female
| 
|-
| rowspan=2|1984
| 
|-
| rowspan=2|Best Female Singer
| 
|-
| rowspan=2|1985
| 
|-
| rowspan=3|Most Fanciable Female
| 
|-
| 1986
| 
|-
| rowspan=3|1987
| 
|-
| Worst Female Singer
| 
|-
| rowspan=2|Best Female Solo Singer
| 
|-
| rowspan=2|1988
| 
|-
| rowspan=2|Most Fanciable Female
| 
|-
| rowspan=2|1989
| 
|-
| Best Female Solo Singer
|

Bibliography
Gardening with Children (2005)
The First-Time Gardener (2006)

References

External links

 
 

1960 births
Living people
Brit Award winners
English dance musicians
English garden writers
English gardeners
English new wave musicians
English songwriters
English television personalities
Women new wave singers
British hi-NRG musicians
People from Chiswick
Rak Records artists
English women pop singers
20th-century English women singers
20th-century English singers
21st-century English women singers
21st-century English women writers
21st-century English singers
English women in electronic music